Block and Bridle  is a professional fraternity in the field of Animal Husbandry. Founded on December 2, 1919 in Chicago, Illinois by the Animal Husbandry clubs from Iowa State University, University of Kansas, University of Missouri and University of Nebraska. As of 2019, Block and Bridle has 99 active chapters.

Emblems
Badge - the Badge consists of a large "B" with a meat block and cleaver in the upper half and a bridle in the lower half. 
Colors - Royal Purple and Navy Blue
Flower - Lilac

Chapter List
The chapter list as of 1940 was:

1919 - Iowa State University
1919 - University of Kansas
1919 - University of Nebraska
1919 - University of Missouri
1920 - West Virginia University
1920 - Oklahoma State University–Stillwater
1920 - University of Minnesota
1923 - University of Kentucky
1924 - Pennsylvania State University
1928 - Washington State University
1930 - Michigan State University
1931 - Louisiana State University
1933 - Texas Tech University
1935 - Virginia Tech
1937 - Cornell University
1937 - University of Florida
1937 - Clemson University
1938 - University of Connecticut
1938 - University of Maryland, College Park
1939 - New Mexico State University
1939 - Mississippi State University

References

External links 
 [blockandbridle.org/home] - Official Page

Student organizations established in 1919
Professional fraternities and sororities in the United States
1919 establishments in Illinois